Larks on a String is a 1969 Czech film directed by Jiří Menzel. The film was banned by the Czechoslovak government, but was later released in 1990 after the fall of the Communist regime. It tells the stories of various characters considered bourgeois by Czechoslovakia's communist government in the 1950s, who have been forced to work in a junkyard for the purposes of re-education. It won the Golden Bear at the 40th Berlin International Film Festival.

Cast
 Rudolf Hrušínský as Trustee
 Vlastimil Brodský as Professor
 Václav Neckář as Pavel Hvezdár
 Jitka Zelenohorská as Jitka
 Jaroslav Satoranský as Guard Andel
 Vladimír Šmeral as Minister
 Ferdinand Krůta as Kudla
 František Řehák as Drobecek
 Leoš Suchařípa as Public prosecutor
 Vladimír Ptáček as Mlíkar
 Eugen Jegorov as Saxophonist (as Evžen Jegorov)
 Naďa Urbánková as Lenka
 Věra Křesadlová as Convict
 Věra Ferbasová as Convict
 Jiřina Štěpničková as Pavel's mother

References

External links 
 

1969 films
1969 comedy films
1990 films
Czechoslovak comedy films
1960s Czech-language films
Films based on works by Bohumil Hrabal
Films directed by Jiří Menzel
Golden Bear winners
Golden Kingfisher winners
Films critical of communism
Censored films